I Don't Prefer No Blues is the second studio album by Leo Bud Welch. Big Legal Mess Records released the album on March 24, 2015. Welch worked with King Louie Bankston, Jimbo Mathus, Bronson Tew, and Bruce Watson, in the production of this album.

Critical reception

Awarding the album four and a half stars from AllMusic, Thom Jurek states, "Welch has given us a blues album for the ages." Michael Toland, giving the album four stars at Blurt Magazine, writes, "It's not just the North Mississippi sound that's in good hands with Welch – it's the blues in general." Rating the album eight stars for PopMatters, Ben Child says, "Pound for pound, track for track, Welch latches onto the stringent intensity of the hill country blues but lets go of the ramshackle." Lins Honeyman, indicating in an eight out of ten review by Cross Rhythms, replies, "Welch does it in style."

Track listing

References

2015 albums
Leo Welch albums